Inam-ul-Haq was a Pakistani cricketer who played for Quetta.

Inam made a single first-class appearance for the team, against 	Pakistan International Airlines B in the Patron's Trophy competition of 1973/74, scoring a duck and 15 runs with the bat, and conceding 51 runs with the ball in 23.4 overs.

External links
Inam-ul-Haq at Cricket Archive 

Pakistani cricketers
Quetta cricketers